Mount Brandaris, or Brandaris, is a hill that is the highest point on the island of Bonaire, a special municipality of the Netherlands in the southern Caribbean Sea.

It is located within the northern part of Washington Slagbaai National Park. This park covers almost the entire north-western portion of Bonaire and is administered by Stinapa, a non-governmental organization that administers the national parks in Bonaire.

References

Mountains and hills of Bonaire